Australasia was the name of a combined team at the 1912 Summer Olympics in Stockholm, Sweden, consisting of 26 athletes from Australia and New Zealand. The combined team had also competed at the 1908 Games, but Australia and New Zealand would send separate teams to the next Games in 1920.

There were three New Zealanders in the 1912 team; Malcolm Champion, Anthony Wilding and George Hill. Wilding won a bronze medal in the men's indoor tennis singles, and Champion won a gold medal as part of the swimming relay team.

Medallists

Results by sport

Athletics

Five athletes competed for Australasia at the 1912 Games.

Rowing

Ten athletes competed for Australasia at the 1912 Games. It was a match racing format.

Swimming

Nine athletes competed for Australasia at the 1912 Games. The team finished with six medals, two of each color, as well as one world record and an additional Olympic record at the end of the Games.

Fanny Durack and Mina Wylie, the two women who swam for Australasia, finished first and second in the only women's individual event, the 100 metres freestyle. Durack set a new Olympic record in the quarterfinals, which held throughout the rest of the competition.

The men's freestyle relay team earned the gold medal, breaking the world record of 10:26.4 (itself being newly set after the Americans broke the 10:53.4 set by the British team at the 1908 Summer Olympics) swam by the United States team in the first semifinal by swimming 12.4 seconds faster in the second final. The Australasia team dropped the world record in that event a further 2.8 seconds in the final.

Harold Hardwick and Cecil Healy each briefly took the Olympic record in the men's 400 meters freestyle heats, with the pair finishing third and fourth, respectively, in the final. Hardwick took another bronze medal in the 1500 free, while Healy took silver in the 100 free.

Tennis

One athlete competed for Australasia at the 1912 Games. Anthony Wilding competed only in the indoor men's singles, finishing with the bronze medal.

References

 The Olympic Games of Stockholm 1912 – Official Report (digitized copy online)
 International Olympic Committee website for Stockholm 1912
 Australian Olympic Committee
sports-reference

Nations at the 1912 Summer Olympics
1912
1912
Olympics
Olympics